In theology, ponerology (from Greek πονηρός ponērós, "evil") is the study of evil. Major subdivisions of the study are the nature of evil, the origin of evil, and evil in relation to the Divine Government.

Karl Immanuel Nitzsch outlined his System der christlichen Lehre (System of Christian Doctrine) into three major rubrics: Agathology, or the Doctrine of the Good; Ponerology, or the Doctrine of the Bad; and Soteriology, or the Doctrine of Salvation. He further subdivided ponerology into the topics of Sin and of Death

See also 
Theodicy
 Political ponerology is an interdisciplinary study of social issues primarily associated with Polish psychiatrist Andrzej Łobaczewski.

References

Ethical issues in religion
Good and evil
Theology